Taiwo Iredele Odubiyi (born 29 May 1965) is a Nigerian author, pastor, international speaker, a marriage and relationship counsellor. Married and blessed with children, Taiwo has written over 29 award-winning inspirational romance novels; 8 children's books; and self-help books on rape and relationships, with new novels/books being published every year. She is the president of TenderHearts Family Support Initiative and the founder of the Pastor Taiwo Odubiyi Ministries. She is also a televangelist; a columnist in The Nigerian Canadian News, The National Mirror, and The US immigration Newspaper; and the host of the Nigerian radio and television programme It's All About You.

Life 
Taiwo Iredele Odubiyi was born into the family of Jonathan Olufemi Soyombo and Victoria Olubamwo Soyombo. She and her twin brother are the youngest in the family of seven children. She was born in Abeokuta, and was raised in Lagos. She attended Reagan Memorial Baptist Secondary school and graduated from a Polytechnic University, with an HND in Accounting. She also has her masters in Business Administration from FUTA, Akure. She and her husband, Sola Odubiyi, were ordained as pastors in 1996, under the leadership of their "Parents in the Lord" Pastor Taiwo Odukoya and the late Pastor Bimbo Odukoya (the general overseers of the Fountain of Life Church). She has three daughters.

Counselling programmes and seminars 
Taiwo expresses her strong passion for relationships through counselling and regular programmes and seminars, such as:
 Covenant Keepers Club (for teens)
 SinglesLink
 Woman to Woman
 When Women Pray
 Tenderheartslink, an online program for Christian singles and couples  (YouTube)

Pastor Taiwo Odubiyi Ministries 
The Pastor Taiwo Odubiyi Ministries is responsible for publishing the award-winning inspirational novels and informative books; counselling individuals on relationships and how to live better lives; spreading the Word and the love of God everywhere through the TV and radio programme It's All About You!; Tenderheartslink on YouTube; and holding regular programmes (programs) and seminars for teens, singles, women and married couples. The Taiwo Odubiyi Ministries Blog contains inspirational notes and Bible Verses to help encourage individuals from every walks of life.

TenderHearts Family Support Initiative 
TenderHearts Family Support Initiative is a non-governmental organisation that deals with supporting, counselling, and encouraging rape victims; reaching out to the less privileged; organising (organizing) Christmas programmes (programs) for children living with disabilities; and rendering emotional & financial support to orphans.

Books

Inspirational romance novels 
These award-winning novels encourage, counsel and guide those in relationships (the single & the married). Quite popular in Nigeria, they are read all around the country, and internationally.
 In Love for Us
 Love Fever
 Love on the Pulpit
 Shadows from the Past
 This Time Around
 Tears on My Pillow
 Oh Baby!
 To Love Again
 You Found Me
 What changed you?
 My First Love
 Too Much of a Good Thing
 With This Ring
 The Forever Kind of Love
 The Came You
 The One For Me
 Sea Of Regrets
Shipwrecked with you
 She who has a man
 Marriage on fire
 If you could see me now
 Accidentally yours
 Life goes on
 When a man loves a woman
 My desire
 I'll take you there
 A Christmas to Remember
 Comfort and Joy

Children's books 
Taiwo believes that it is never too early to teach and educate children on the dangers of sex before marriage, and on being aware of child molesters.
 Rescued by Victor
 No one is a Nobody
 Greater Tomorrow
 The Boy who Stole
 Joe And His Step Mother, Bibi
 Nike and the Stranger
 Billy the Bully
 Jonah's first day of school

Other books on relationships and rape 
 30 Things Husbands Do That Hurt Their Wives
 30 Things Wives Do That Hurt Their Husbands
 God's Words to Singles
 Devotional for Singles
 Rape & How to Handle It [English Version]. (This book is to encourage, counsel and advise those who have been raped and their loved ones; to deter it from happening to others; and to inform the public on the seriousness of the issue.)
 Ifi'pa bani lopo (Yoruba version of Rape & How to Handle It)
 God's words to couples
 God's words to women in Ministry
 God's words to older adults
 Real answers real quick for couples
 Real answers real quick for singles

See also
Nigerian woman novelists
 Chimamanda Ngozi Adichie
 Buchi Emecheta
 Flora Nwapa
 Karen King-Aribisala
 Adaobi Tricia Nwaubani
 Ifeoma Okoye
 Adaora Lily Ulasi

References

External links 
 

1965 births
Living people
Nigerian television evangelists
Nigerian Christians
Writers from Abeokuta
Nigerian children's writers
Nigerian women novelists
Yoruba Christian clergy
20th-century Nigerian novelists
Nigerian women children's writers
20th-century Nigerian women writers
Yoruba women writers
Yoruba children's writers
Federal University of Technology Akure alumni
English-language writers from Nigeria
Nigerian Christian writers
Nigerian twins
Women Christian clergy
Fraternal twins
21st-century Nigerian women writers